Central Telegraph is a Russian telecommunications company.

Central Telegraph may also refer to:

 Central Telegraph (newspaper), a newspaper in Queensland, Australia
 Central Telegraph Office (disambiguation)